Rosemarie Zens (born 1944, Bad Polzin, Germany; present-day Połczyn-Zdrój, Poland) is a German writer and photographer.

Life
Zens studied biology, history and English literature.  Teaching jobs have brought her to Munich, Düsseldorf and Berkeley, California. She received her PhD in German Literature at the Ludwig-Maximilian University in Munich. Subsequently trained as a psychoanalyst she works as a psychotherapist in her own office. She currently lives in Berlin. Since 1995 she has continuously published poems and prose in literary magazines, separate volumes and audio CDs.

Works
  - Photography and text.
  - Selected writings and photographs.
  
  - Selected poems. 
 
  - Poems.
  - Gedichte mit Holzschnitten von Wilfried Bohne und Kompositionen für Stimme und E-Gitarre von Friedemann Graef.

Recordings 

 Die Schöne Das Fortgehen Der Ort. (Text and voice: Rosemarie Zens, guitar: Jürgen Heckel) audio book, Edition WortOrt, Berlin 2006
 Siliziumherz. Poesie und Perkussion. (Text: Rosemarie Zens, composition: Ulrich Moritz), Berlin 2003
 Lautlos. Regenaten. Rosemarie Zens, Künstlerporträt, audio book, Berlin 2002

Sources
 www.d-nb.de Rosemarie Zens at catalog of Deutsche Nationalbibliothek
 www.literaturport.de Rosemarie Zens at Literaturport Berlin | Brandenburg
 www.rimbaud.de Rosemarie Zens at the web site of the Rimbaud publishing house
 www.artbooksheidelberg.com Rosemarie Zens at the web site of Artbooks Heidelberg
 www.zens.info Own Homepage
 www.zeitschrift-signum.de German literature magazine Signum
 www.poetenladen.de German online and print literature magazine

1944 births
Living people
German women novelists
Ludwig Maximilian University of Munich alumni
Date of birth missing (living people)
People from Połczyn-Zdrój
People from the Province of Pomerania